"Last Song" is a 1972 hit song by Canadian trio Edward Bear. It was the first release from their self-titled third album and was their greatest hit. The song is written in the key of F# Major.

"Last Song" spent 18 weeks on the U.S. charts, and peaked at number three on the Billboard Hot 100. It reached number one in Canada, and did the same on the Adult Contemporary charts of both nations. "Last Song" was certified gold in the United States by the RIAA.

In 1994, music industry magazine RPM placed "Last Song" at number 20 on its list of the Top 100 Canadian singles since the magazine's founding in 1964.

Chart performance

Weekly charts

Year-end charts

Inspiration
In an interview published on the website for the Canadian Songwriters Hall of Fame, composer Larry Evoy states that the song was inspired by his own personal experience. "It was written over a period of time and was literal. I would actually go to sleep with my light on, hoping that she’d think I was still awake and would drop by, and she did."

Certifications and sales

References

External links
 Lyrics of this song
 

1972 singles
RPM Top Singles number-one singles
1972 songs
Capitol Records singles
Songs about music
Edward Bear songs